Nathan Paetsch (born March 30, 1983) is a Canadian former professional ice hockey defenceman who played in the National Hockey League (NHL) with the Buffalo Sabres and Columbus Blue Jackets.

Playing career
Paetsch was originally drafted in the 2nd round, 52nd overall, in 2001 NHL Entry Draft by the Washington Capitals. However, the Capitals were unable to reach a contract agreement with him, so he was put back into the draft in 2003. Paetsch was re-drafted in the seventh round, 202nd overall, by the Sabres in the 2003 NHL Entry Draft.

Paetsch stepped into full-time WHL duty with the Moose Jaw Warriors as a 16-year-old in 1999. Paetsch was named Moose Jaw's defenceman of the year and playoff MVP after the 2000–01 season. Paetsch has also played in several national tournaments, including the 2000 Under-17 Championships and the 2000 Under-18 Four Nations Cup. In addition, he played for Team Cherry in the 2001 CHL Top Prospects Game.

Paetsch played his first professional season in 2003–04 with the Sabres AHL affiliate, the Rochester Americans.

During the 2005–06 season, Paetsch played his first NHL game on January 7, 2006, for the Sabres and he recorded his first NHL point. Paetsch was then returned to the Americans, for the remainder of the season. Due to a plethora of injuries to defensemen during the 2006 Stanley Cup Playoffs, he was recalled to the Sabres and made his NHL playoff debut in Game 7 of the Eastern Conference Finals against the Carolina Hurricanes.

After re-signing to a one-year contract on July 14, 2005, Paetsch established himself with the Sabres in 2006–07, playing in a career high 63 games, recording 24 points.

On July 31, 2007, Paetsch was re-signed to a three-year contract with the Sabres.

During the 2009–10 season, Paetsch was limited to a reserve defenseman with the Sabres. On January 4, 2010, Paetsch was placed, and later cleared, on waivers from the Sabres. After 11 games with the Sabres, Paetsch was traded, along with a second round draft pick, to the Columbus Blue Jackets for forward Raffi Torres on March 3, 2010.

On July 7, 2010, Paetsch signed with the Florida Panthers for one year on a one-way contract worth $525,000. Not making the Panthers' squad, he was waived to the Panthers' AHL affiliate, the Rochester Americans. On October 7, his one-way contract was traded to the Vancouver Canucks for defenseman Sean Zimmerman, on a two-way contract. The Canucks then loaned Paetsch and Andrew Peters back to the Americans. On November 1, Paetsch and Peters were removed from the Amerks roster due to curfew violations, with Paetsch moving to the Syracuse Crunch and Peters ultimately retiring.

On June 21, 2011, Paetsch left the NHL to sign a one-year contract in Europe for the 2011–12 season, with EHC Wolfsburg of the German DEL.

On July 9, 2012, Paetsch signed a one-year AHL contract with the Grand Rapids Griffins for the 2012–13 season. Paetsch won the Calder Cup with the Griffins in 2013. On July 9, 2013, Paetsch re-signed a two-year AHL contract with the Grand Rapids Griffins through the 2014–15 season.

During the 2014–15 season, Paetsch eight goals and 30 assists, in 75 games. His 30 assists ranked second on the team, and his 38 points tied for fifth overall on the team and 12th among all AHL defensemen, marking his highest-scoring season since 2005–06 with Rochester.

On July 6, 2015, Paetsch signed a two-year AHL contract with the Grand Rapids Griffins.

After leading the Griffins as captain to their second Calder Cup in the 2016–17 season, before leaving as a free agent after five years with the club. On September 12, 2017, he opted to continue in the AHL in signing a one-year contract in a return to the Rochester Americans.

Paetsch announced his retirement after 17 professional seasons in December 2020.

Personal
Paetsch grew up in a town called Leroy, Saskatchewan, but was born in Humboldt since it was the nearest town with a hospital. Paetsch and his wife maintain a home in Spencerport, New York, a suburb of Rochester.

Paetsch has been convicted of gambling-related charges.

Career statistics

Regular season and playoffs

International

Awards and honours

References

External links

1983 births
Living people
Buffalo Sabres draft picks
Buffalo Sabres players
Canadian ice hockey defencemen
Columbus Blue Jackets players
Grizzlys Wolfsburg players
Grand Rapids Griffins players
Ice hockey people from Saskatchewan
Moose Jaw Warriors players
People from Spencerport, New York
Sportspeople convicted of crimes
Sportspeople from Humboldt, Saskatchewan
Rochester Americans players
Syracuse Crunch players
Washington Capitals draft picks
Canadian expatriate ice hockey players in the United States